is the second film based on the popular Bayside Shakedown TV series, known for its unique and humorous depiction of the Japanese police force while avoiding the conventions that define most police dramas. The movie was released in the summer of 2003. Bayside Shakedown 2 is the all-time highest-grossing Japanese live-action movie on domestic screens and earned  at the box office.

Plot 
The movie takes place again in the fictional Wangan Station of the Tokyo Metropolitan Police Department, in the five years since the previous movie, the once empty space within Wangan's jurisdiction (the station was once referred to disparagingly as "the empty space station" by the surrounding jurisdictions) has become a popular tourist attraction, the officers at Wangan Station now have their hands full dealing with all manner of tourist related issues. In a sign of how much has not changed in the last five years, when Detective Sergeant Shunsaku Aoshima and several of other detectives playing the part of terrorists defeat a Special Assault Team unit during a counterterrorism exercise in front of the police brass and the media, all the detectives promptly have their pay docked by headquarters.

When a string of murders of company execs begins taking place, Aoshima jumps at the opportunity to pursue something other than his current case, which he finds less than inspiring. However, the powers that be have other ideas, and Wangan again plays host to a special investigation team from headquarters, led by Superintendent Okita, whose inflexible methods, reliance on technology over old-fashioned police work, and condescending attitude towards the locals quickly leads to one fiasco after another, with the local officers working to clean up the resulting mess. Aoshima's friend Superintendent Shinji Muroi, assigned by headquarters to assist Okita, is again powerless to help the local officers as decisions are made by the higher ups.

Credits

Cast
 Yūji Oda - Sergeant Shunsaku Aoshima
 Toshirō Yanagiba - Superintendent Shinji Muroi
 Eri Fukatsu - Sergeant Sumire Onda
 Miki Mizuno - Sergeant Yukino Kashiwagi
 Yūsuke Santamaria - Inspector Masayoshi Mashita
 Miki Maya - Superintendent Okita
 Chosuke Ikariya - Senior Inspector Heihachiro Waku
 Kenta Satoi - Section Chief Uozumi
 Toshio Kakei - Superintendent Shinjo
 Kotaro Koizumi - Surveillance Room Operator Shigeru Koike
 Soichiro Kitamura - Chief Kanda
 Takehiko Ono - Division Chief Hakamada
 Satoru Saito - Assistant Chief Akiyama
 John Sledge - American in Casino

Crew
Chihiro Kameyama - producer
Kuga Maeda, Daisuke Sekiguchi - assistant producers.
Ryoichi Kimizuka - writer
Katsuyuki Motohiro - director

Reception
During nine successive weeks it was number-one, a record that hasn't been matched since by a domestic live action film.

See also
Bayside Shakedown
Bayside Shakedown: The Movie
List of highest-grossing films in Japan

References

External links

Movie Review from lovehkfilm.com

2003 films
2000s Japanese-language films
2000s crime comedy films
Japanese crime comedy films
2000s parody films
Police detective films
Films set in Tokyo
Films directed by Katsuyuki Motohiro
2000s police comedy films
2003 comedy films
2000s Japanese films